Broadway Subway may refer to:

Lines 

 Broadway Subway (IRT), a New York City subway line
 Broadway Subway (BMT), a New York City subway line
 Broadway Subway Project, an extension of the Millennium Line in Vancouver, Canada